Jeffrey Allen Hart (born September 10, 1953 in Portland, Oregon) is a former  gridiron football offensive lineman who played seven seasons in the National Football League, two seasons in the Canadian Football League, and two seasons in the United States Football League.

References

1953 births
Living people
American football offensive tackles
Oregon State Beavers football players
San Francisco 49ers players
New Orleans Saints players
American players of Canadian football
Canadian football offensive linemen
Winnipeg Blue Bombers players
Baltimore Colts players
Los Angeles Express players
Players of American football from Portland, Oregon
Sportspeople from Portland, Oregon